The 1914–15 Yorkshire Cup was the tenth occasion on which the Yorkshire Cup competition, a Rugby league competition, was held.

This year's competition was again the turn of the previous cup holder, Huddersfield, winning the trophy by beating Hull F.C. by the score of 31-0

The match was played at Headingley, Leeds, now in West Yorkshire. The attendance was 12,000 and receipts were £422

This was Huddersfield's fifth appearance of what would be seven appearances in eight consecutive finals between 1909 and 1919 (which included four successive victories and six in total.) It was also the second of the four consecutive wins.

Background 
Britain had declared war on Germany on 4 August 1914 after they had attacked Luxemburg, Belgium and France. A month later the season proper started against this backdrop. The Yorkshire Cup competition started in October and it was to be the last until the end of the war. Tensions had been building across Britain and the rest of Europe for some time, but, despite this, the 1914–1915 season was played to its conclusion, albeit in some cases a little half-heartedly as evidenced in the lower attendances at matches and with several teams absent and many players already enlisted in the Armed Forces. In the middle of 1915 competitive sporting competition was finally suspended. This season there were no junior/amateur clubs taking part, no new entrants and no "leavers" and so the total of entries remained the same at thirteen. This in turn resulted in three byes in the first round.

Competition and Results

Round 1 
Involved  5 matches (with three byes) and 13 clubs

Round 2 – quarterfinals 
Involved 4 matches and 8 clubs

Round 2 - Replays  
Involved  1 match and 2 clubs

Round 3 – semifinals  
Involved 2 matches and 4 clubs

Final

Teams and scorers 

Scoring - Try = three (3) points - Goal = two (2) points - Drop goal = two (2) points

The road to success

Notes and comments 
1 * Match abandoned after 50 minutes due to fog

2 * The  never to be beaten record widest margin victory in a final

3 * Headingley, Leeds, is the home ground of Leeds RLFC with a capacity of 21,000. The record attendance was  40,175 for a league match between Leeds and Bradford Northern on 21 May 1947.

General information for those unfamiliar 
The Rugby League Yorkshire Cup competition was a knock-out competition between (mainly professional) rugby league clubs from  the  county of Yorkshire. The actual area was at times increased to encompass other teams from  outside the  county such as Newcastle, Mansfield, Coventry, and even London (in the form of Acton & Willesden.

The Rugby League season always (until the onset of "Summer Rugby" in 1996) ran from around August-time through to around May-time and this competition always took place early in the season, in the Autumn, with the final taking place in (or just before) December (The only exception to this was when disruption of the fixture list was caused during, and immediately after, the two World Wars).

See also 
1914–15 Northern Rugby Football Union season
Rugby league county cups

References

External links
Saints Heritage Society
1896–97 Northern Rugby Football Union season at wigan.rlfans.com
Hull&Proud Fixtures & Results 1896/1897
Widnes Vikings - One team, one passion Season In Review - 1896-97
The Northern Union at warringtonwolves.org

RFL Yorkshire Cup
Yorkshire Cup